Aleksandr Nikolayevich Andryushchenko (born November 2, 1954) is a Russian professional football coach and a former player who currently works as a sports department manager for FC Rostov.

Honours
 Soviet Cup winner: 1981.

External links
 Career summary by KLISF

1954 births
Living people
People from Sievierodonetsk
Soviet footballers
FC Karpaty Lviv players
PFC CSKA Moscow players
FC SKA Rostov-on-Don players
Association football defenders
Association football midfielders